Atractus zidoki, Zidok's ground snake, is a species of snake in the family Colubridae. The species can be found in Brazil, French Guiana, and Colombia.

References 

Atractus
Reptiles of Colombia
Reptiles of Brazil
Reptiles of French Guiana]
Snakes of South America
Reptiles described in 1979